The Valençay SOE Memorial is a monument in France to the members of the Special Operations Executive F Section who lost their lives working to liberate the country during World War II.

The memorial was unveiled in the town of Valençay, in the department of Indre, on May 6, 1991, marking the fiftieth anniversary of the despatch of F Section's first agent to France.

Former SOE agents Pearl Witherington Cornioley and her husband Henri, who lived nearby, promoted the establishment of the memorial. Witherington had worked in the area as a SOE agent during World war II. The monument was designed by Elizabeth Lucas Harrison, herself a former Resistance member, who originally gave it the name "Spirit of Partnership".

Dedicated by the Minister of Veterans Affairs for France and Queen Elizabeth The Queen Mother, the memorial's  Roll of Honour lists the names of the 91 men and 13 women members of the SOE who gave their lives for France's freedom.

Valençay Memorial Roll of Honour
(from website: SOE and Valençay Monument)

Jack Charles Stanmore Agazarian
Roland Eugene Jean Alexandre
Elisee A. L. Allard
Phillip John Amphlett
James Frederick Amps
Joseph Antoine France Antelme
Denis John Barrett
Alcide Beauregard
Francisque Eugene Bec
Yolande Elsa Maria Beekman
Robert Marcel Charles Benoist
Louis Eugene Desire Bertheau
Gustave Daniel Alfred Biéler
Andre G. Bloch
Denise Madeleine Bloch
Marcus Reginald Bloom
Andrée Raymonde Borrel
Jean Bouguennec
Muriel Tamara Byck
Robert Bennett Byerly
Eric Joseph Denis Cauchi
Marcel Clech
George Clement
Ted Cyril Coppin
Madeleine Zoe Damerment
Marcel Enzebe Defence
Ange Defendini
George William Hedworth Demand
Francois Adolphe Deniset
Julien Theodore Joseph M. Detal
Roland Dowlen
André J. R. Dubois
Émile Georges Jean Duboudin 
Phillip Francis Duclos
David Haughton Finlayson
Marcel Georges Florent Fox
Henri Jacques Paul Frager
Henri Hubert Gaillot
Émile August Henri Garry
Pierre Albert Hubert Geelen
Harry Huntington Graham
William Charles Frederick Grover-Williams
John Trevor Hamilton
Victor Charles Hayes
Noor Inayat Khan
Sidney Charles Jones
Clement Marc Jumeau
A. R. Landsdell
Maurice Louis M. A. Larcher
Marcel Mathieu René Leccia
Jacques Paul Henri Ledoux
 Lionel Lee
Cecily Margot Lefort
Vera Eugenie Leigh
M. A. Lepage
E. Lesout
Eugene Francis (Levene) Felangue
John Kenneth Macalister
Stanislaw Makowski
Claude Raymond Malraux
R. M. A. Mathieu
Andre Adrian Jules Maugenet
James Andrew Mayer
G. B. McBain
James Francis George Mennesson
Francois Gerard Michel
Comte Jacques-Arthus Marc de Montalembert
Pierre Louis Mulsant
Isidore Newman 
Gilbert Maurice Norman
Paul Baptiste Pardi
Maurice Pertschuk
Frank Herbert Dedrick Pickersgill
Éliane Sophie Plewman
Adolphe Rabinovitch
Brian Dominic Rafferty
Charles Rechenmann
Jean Renaud
Jean Renaud-Dandicolle
Lilian Vera Rolfe
Diana Hope Rowden
Yvonne Claire Rudellat
Roméo Sabourin
Gonzague de Saint-Geniès
Paul F. M. Sarrette
Alexandre Schwatschko
Henry P. Sevenet
David Whytehead Sibrée
Jean Alexandre Robert Simon
Octave Anne Guillaume Simon
Jack Andrew Eugene Marcel Sinclair
Charles Milne Skepper
V. A. Soskice
Arthur Steele
Francis Alfred Suttill
Violette Reine Elizabeth Bushell Szabo
P. R. Tessier
Michael Alfred Raymond Trotobas
Paul Ullman
François M. C. Vallée
E. M. Wilkinson
George Alfred "Teddy" Wilkinson
Jean Worms
John Cuthbert Young

References

Citations

Bibliography
 Foot, M.R.D. (2004) SOE in France, Whitehall history publishing, ISSN 1474-8398
 Grehan, J. and Mace, M. (2012) Unearthing Churchill’s Secret Army: The Official List of SOE Casualties and Their Stories, Pen and Sword, 

World War II memorials in France
British military memorials and cemeteries
Special Operations Executive
Buildings and structures in Indre
Tourist attractions in Indre